Bec Cartwright is the first and only album by Australian actress/singer Bec Cartwright, released in Australia on 16 June 2003, by East West Records through Warner Music. Three singles were released from the album: "All Seats Taken", "On the Borderline" and "A Matter of Time" – all to top 30 success in Australia.

Track listing
"On the Borderline" – 3:22
"All That Glitters" – 3:08
"All Seats Taken" – 3:31
"A Matter of Time" – 3:34
"Meant to Be" – 3:18
"Drive By" – 3:24
"What's Got into You" – 3:38
"Falling" – 3:16
"Need a Little Love" – 3:25
"He's Yours" – 3:24

Charts

References

2003 debut albums
Bec Hewitt albums
East West Records albums